Christianity is a minority in Zhejiang province of China. Zhejiang has one of the largest Protestant populations of China. Immaculate Conception Cathedral of Hangzhou is in Zhejiang. Zhejiang has greater religious freedom of Christianity than other parts of the country. There were more than 600 detentions of Christians in the province in 2006. The Shouters are active in the province.
Christianity in Wenzhou is a disproportionately large population.

Roman Catholic dioceses with seat in Zhejiang 
Roman Catholic Archdiocese of Hangzhou
Roman Catholic Diocese of Lishui
Roman Catholic Diocese of Ningbo
Roman Catholic Diocese of Taizhou
Roman Catholic Diocese of Yongjia

See also 
Chinese Rites controversy
Zhushenjiao
 Christianity in Zhejiang's neighbouring provinces
 Christianity in Anhui
 Christianity in Fujian
 Christianity in Jiangsu
 Christianity in Jiangxi
 Christianity in Shanghai

References

 
Religion in Zhejiang
Christianity in China by location